Jonny Campbell is a British director.

Biography
Campbell studied French and German at Durham University and began his career at Granada TV working on documentaries. He soon moved into drama.

Selected filmography

Film
 Alien Autopsy (2006)

TV
 Peter Kay's Phoenix Nights 6 Episodes (2001)
 Spooks (two episodes, 2004)
 Ashes to Ashes (2008)
 Doctor Who ('The Vampires of Venice' and 'Vincent and the Doctor', 2010)
 Eric and Ernie (2011) (TV film)
 In the Flesh (2013)
 The Casual Vacancy (2015)
 Westworld'' (2016)
Dracula ('The Rules of the Beast', 2020)

References

External links
http://www.imdb.com/name/nm0132600/

British television directors
Living people
Year of birth missing (living people)
Alumni of Durham University